Roman Avramenko (born 23 March 1988 in Kirovske) is a Ukrainian javelin thrower.

He qualified for the 2012 Summer Olympics. He did not progress to the final and finished in 14th place with a throw of 80.06 metres.

He served a two-year doping ban for the use of a prohibited substance, Dehydrochloromethyltestosterone, having tested positive at the 2013 World Championships, where he had finished in fifth position. The ban lasted from 17 August 2013 to 27 August 2015.

A native of Crimea, he transferred his eligibility to Russia but received an 8-year doping ban shortly afterwards due to a failed out of competition test.  The effective start date of the ban was 30 July 2015 (before the previous ban had expired).

International competitions

Seasonal bests by year
 2004 – 72.68
 2005 – 70.27
 2006 – 76.01
 2007 – 77.88
 2008 – 80.08
 2009 – 79.50
 2010 – 81.12
 2011 – 84.30
 2012 – 81.87
 2013 – 84.48

References
 

1988 births
Living people
People from Kirovske Raion
Ukrainian male javelin throwers
Russian male javelin throwers
Olympic athletes of Ukraine
Athletes (track and field) at the 2008 Summer Olympics
Athletes (track and field) at the 2012 Summer Olympics
World Athletics Championships athletes for Ukraine
Doping cases in athletics
Ukrainian sportspeople in doping cases
Russian sportspeople in doping cases
Universiade medalists in athletics (track and field)
Universiade silver medalists for Ukraine
Competitors at the 2009 Summer Universiade
Medalists at the 2011 Summer Universiade